María Auxiliadora “Yaki” Martínez Vecca (born 24 May 1999), also known as María Vecca and Yaki Vecca, is a Paraguayan professional footballer who plays as a center back for Chilean club Universidad de Chile and the Paraguay women's national team.

References

External links

1999 births
Living people
People from Itauguá
Paraguayan women's footballers
Women's association football fullbacks
Women's association football central defenders
Women's association football midfielders
Deportivo Capiatá players
Campeonato Brasileiro de Futebol Feminino Série A1 players
Paraguay women's international footballers
Pan American Games competitors for Paraguay
Footballers at the 2019 Pan American Games
Paraguayan expatriate women's footballers
Paraguayan expatriate sportspeople in Brazil
Expatriate women's footballers in Brazil